Patagonia National Park may refer to:
 Patagonia National Park (Argentina), a national park the Argentinian portion of Patagonia
 Patagonia National Park (Chile), a national park in the Chilean portion of Patagonia